Piesocorynus is a genus of fungus weevils in the family Anthribidae. There are about 5 described species in Piesocorynus.

Species
 Piesocorynus lateralis Jordan, 1906
 Piesocorynus mixtus LeConte, 1876
 Piesocorynus moestus (J. E. LeConte, 1824)
 Piesocorynus plagifer Jordan, 1904
 Piesocorynus tesselatus Schaeffer, 1906

References

 Valentine, Barry D. (1998). "A review of Nearctic and some related Anthribidae (Coleoptera)". Insecta Mundi, vol. 12, no. 3 and 4, 251–296.
 Valentine, Barry D. / Arnett, Ross H. Jr., Michael C. Thomas, P. E. Skelley, and J. H. Frank, eds. (2002). "Family 126. Anthribidae". American Beetles, vol. 2: Polyphaga: Scarabaeoidea through Curculionoidea, 695–700.

Further reading

 Arnett, R. H. Jr., M. C. Thomas, P. E. Skelley and J. H. Frank. (eds.). (21 June 2002). American Beetles, Volume II: Polyphaga: Scarabaeoidea through Curculionoidea. CRC Press LLC, Boca Raton, Florida .
 
 Richard E. White. (1983). Peterson Field Guides: Beetles. Houghton Mifflin Company.

Anthribidae